Jonsknuten  is a mountain in the municipality of Kongsberg in Buskerud, Norway.

Kongsberg
Mountains of Viken